Lye Town Football Club is a football club based in the Black Country town of Lye, Stourbridge, West Midlands, England.

History
The club was established in 1930 as Lye & Wollescote Amateur Football Club and joined the Worcestershire Combination. They were renamed Lye Town the following year. The club were runners-up in the Worcestershire Combination in 1932–33 and won the Birmingham Junior Cup the following season. They were league runners-up again in 1934–35 before winning the league in 1935–36. They were runners-up in the Worcestershire Combination for a third time in 1937–38, also winning the Birmingham Junior Cup, retaining the Cup the following season.

Following World War II Lye played in the Central Amateur League in the 1946–47 season before joining the Birmingham & District League in 1947. They were placed in the South Division when the league was reorganised in 1954, with a tenth-place finish seeing them placed in Division One for the 1955–56 season. They subsequently finished bottom of the Division and were relegated to Division Two. The league reverted to a single division in 1960 and was renamed the West Midlands (Regional) League in 1962.

The league gained a second division in 1965, with Lye becoming members of the Premier Division. Despite finishing bottom of the Premier Division in 1965–66 and 1966–67, the club were not relegated to Division One. They were Premier Division runners-up in 1976–77 before finishing second in three consecutive seasons between 1978–79 and 1980–81. In 1997–98 the club were Premier Division champions, but were not promoted to the Midland Alliance.

In 2010–11 Lye won the Birmingham Midweek Floodlit Cup, beating Nuneaton Griff 1–0 in the final. They were Premier Division runners-up in 2012–13 and won the Floodlit Cup for a second time with a 2–1 win over Southam United in the final. The club went on to win both the Worcestershire Senior Urn and the Premier Division the following season, earning promotion to the Premier Division of the newly formed Midland League.  In the 2021–22 season Lye won the JW Hunt Cup.

Ground

The club play at the Sports Ground on Stourbridge Road, which is shared with the local cricket club; a temporary rail is erected on the northern side of the pitch during the football season. A seated stand was built at the Stourbridge Road end after World War II. A new stand was built on the southern side of the pitch in 1971, with the seats from the post-war stand later moved into the newer stand when the older stand was demolished. A covered standing area with a barrel roof was built behind one goal.

Honours
West Midlands (Regional) League
Premier Division champions 1997–98, 2013–14
Worcestershire Combination
Champions 1935–36
Worcestershire Senior Urn
Winners 2013–14
Birmingham Midweek Floodlit Cup
Winners 2010–11, 2012–13
Birmingham Junior Cup
Winners 1933–34, 1937–38, 1938–39
J W Hunt Cup
Winners 2021–22

Records
Best FA Cup performance: Third qualifying round, 1979–80, 1986–87, 1989–90
Best FA Trophy performance: Third qualifying round, 1975–76, 1979–80
Best FA Vase performance: Fourth round, 1995–96, 2018-19
Record appearances.Andy Crannage 415  1986-1997  Mark Bache 376  1999-2007
Record goal scorer . Nathan Thomas  109 goals (121 appearances)  1995-1998

See also
Lye Town F.C. players

References

External links
Club website

Football clubs in England
Football clubs in the West Midlands (county)
Association football clubs established in 1930
1930 establishments in England
Sport in Dudley
Midland Football Combination
Central Amateur League
West Midlands (Regional) League
Midland Football League